Italo Jose Dejter (December 17, 1939) is an Argentine-born American mathematician, a retired professor of mathematics and computer science from the University of Puerto Rico, (August 1984-February 2018) and a researcher in algebraic topology, 
differential topology, graph theory, coding theory and combinatorial designs.
He obtained a Licentiate degree in mathematics from  University of Buenos Aires in 1967, arrived at Rutgers University in 1970 by means of a Guggenheim Fellowship and obtained a Ph.D. degree in mathematics in 1975 under the supervision of Professor Ted Petrie, with support of the National Science Foundation. He was a professor at the
Federal University of Santa Catarina, Brazil, from 1977 to 1984, with grants from the National Council for Scientific and Technological Development, (CNPq).

Dejter has been a visiting scholar at a number of research institutions, including University of São Paulo, Instituto Nacional de Matemática Pura e Aplicada, Federal University of Rio Grande do Sul,
University of Cambridge, National Autonomous University of Mexico, 
Simon Fraser University, University of Victoria, New York University, University of Illinois at Urbana–Champaign, McMaster University, DIMACS, Autonomous University of Barcelona, Technical University of Denmark, Auburn University, Polytechnic University of Catalonia, Technical University of Madrid, Charles University, Ottawa University and Simón Bolívar University. The sections below describe the relevance of Dejter's work in the research areas  mentioned in the first paragraph above, or in the adjacent box.

Algebraic and differential topology
In 1971, Ted Petrie conjectured that if X is a closed, smooth 2n-dimensional homotopy complex projective space that admits a nontrivial smooth action of the circle,
and if a function h, mapping  X onto the 2n-dimensional complex projective space, is a homotopy equivalence, then h preserves the Pontrjagin classes. In 1975, Dejter proved Petrie's Conjecture for n=3,
establishing this way that every closed, smooth, 6-dimensional homotopy
complex projective space must be the complex 3-dimensional projective space CP3. Dejter's result is most relevant in view of Petrie's exotic S1-actions on CP3, (apart from the trivial S1-actions on CP3).

Let G be a compact Lie group, let Y be a smooth G-manifold and let F a G-fibre
map between G-vector bundles of the same dimension over Y which on each
G-fibre is proper and has degree one.  Petrie also asked: What are necessary and sufficient conditions for the existence of a smooth G-map properly G-homotopic to F and transverse to the zero-section? Dejter provided both types of conditions, which do not close to a necessary and sufficient condition due to a counterexample.

The main tool involved in establishing the results above by reducing differential-topology problems into algebraic-topology solutions is equivariant algebraic K-theory, where equivariance is understood with respect to the group given by the circle, i.e. the unit circle of the complex plane.

Graph theory

Erdős–Pósa theorem and odd cycles
In 1962, Paul Erdős and Lajos Pósa proved that for every positive integer k there exists a positive integer k' such that for every graph G, either (i) G has k vertex-disjoint (long and/or even) cycles or (ii) there exists a subset X of less than k' vertices of G such that G \ X
has no (long and/or even) cycles. This result, known today as the Erdős–Pósa theorem, cannot be extended to odd cycles. In fact, in 1987 Dejter and Víctor Neumann-Lara showed that given an integer k > 0, there exists a graph G not possessing disjoint odd cycles such that the number of vertices of G whose removal destroys all odd cycles of G is higher than k.

Ljubljana graph in binary 7-cube
In 1993,
Brouwer, Dejter and Thomassen described an undirected, bipartite graph with 112 vertices and 168 edges, 
(semi-symmetric, that is edge-transitive but not vertex-transitive, cubic graph with diameter 8, radius 7, chromatic number 2, chromatic index 3, girth 10, with exactly 168 cycles of length 10 and 168 cycles of length 12), known since 2002 as the Ljubljana graph. They  also established that the Dejter graph, obtained by deleting a copy
of the Hamming code of length 7 from the binary
7-cube, admits a 3-factorization into two copies of the Ljubljana graph. See also.

In fact, two questions were answered in, namely:

(a) How many colors are needed for a coloring of the n-cube without monochromatic 4-cycles or 6-cycles? Brouwer, Dejter and Thomassen showed that 4 colors suffice and thereby settle a problem of Erdős.
(Independently found by F.R.K.Chung. Improving on this, Marston Conder in 1993 showed that for all n not less than 3 the edges of the n-cube can be 3-colored in such a way that there is no monochromatic 4-cycle or 6-cycle).

(b) Which vertex-transitive induced subgraphs does a hypercube have? The Dejter graph mentioned above is 6-regular, vertex-transitive and, as suggested, its edges can be 2-colored so that the two resulting monochromatic subgraphs are isomorphic to the semi-symmetric Ljubljana graph of girth 10.

In 1972, I. Z. Bouwer attributed a graph with the mentioned properties of the Ljubljana graph to R. M. Foster.

Coxeter graph and Klein graph
In 2012, Dejter showed that the 56-vertex Klein cubic graph F{56}B, denoted here Γ', can be obtained from the 28-vertex Coxeter cubic graph Γ by zipping adequately the squares of the 24 7-cycles of Γ endowed with an
orientation obtained by considering Γ as a -ultrahomogeneous digraph, where  is the collection formed both by the oriented 7-cycles and the 2-arcs that tightly
fasten those oriented 7-cycles in Γ. In the process, it is seen that
Γ' is a C'-ultrahomogeneous (undirected) graph, where C' is the collection formed by both the 7-cycles and the 1-paths that tightly fasten those
7-cycles in Γ'. This yields an embedding of Γ' into a 3-torus T3 which forms the Klein map of Coxeter notation (7,3)8. The dual graph of Γ' in T3 is the
distance-regular Klein quartic graph, with corresponding dual map of Coxeter notation (3,7)8. Other aspects of this work are also cited in the following pages:

Bitangents of a quartic.Coxeter graph.Heawood graph.

In 2010, Dejter  adapted the notion of -ultrahomogeneous graph for digraphs, and presented a strongly connected
-ultrahomogeneous oriented graph on 168 vertices and 126 pairwise arc-disjoint 4-cycles with regular indegree and outdegree 3 and no circuits of lengths 2 and 3 by altering a definition of the Coxeter graph via pencils of ordered lines of the Fano plane in which pencils were replaced by ordered pencils.

The study of ultrahomogeneous graphs (respectively, digraphs) can be
traced back to Sheehan, 
Gardiner, Ronse, 
Cameron, Gol'fand and Klin, (respectively, Fraïssé, Lachlan and Woodrow, Cherlin). See also page 77 in Bondy and Murty.

Kd-ultrahomogeneous configurations

Motivated in 2013  by the study of connected Menger graphs  of self-dual 1-configurations (nd)1 
 expressible as Kd-ultrahomogeneous graphs, Dejter wondered for which values of n such graphs exist, as they would yield the most symmetrical, connected, edge-disjoint unions of n copies of Kd on n vertices in which the roles of vertices and copies of Kd are
interchangeable. For d=4, known values of n are: n=13,
21 and n=42, This reference, by Dejter in 2009, yields a graph G for which each isomorphism between two of the 42 copies of K4 or two of the 21 copies of K2,2,2 in G extends to an automorphism of G. While it would be of interest to determine the spectrum and multiplicities of the involved values of n, Dejter contributes the value of n=102 via the Biggs-Smith
association scheme (presented via sextets mod 17), shown to control attachment of 102 (cuboctahedral) copies of the line graph of the 3-cube to the 102 (tetrahedral) copies of K4, these sharing each triangle with two copies of the cuboctahedral copies and guaranteeing that the distance 3-graph of the Biggs-Smith graph is the Menger graph of a self-dual 1-configuration (1024)1.
This result was obtained as an application of a transformation of distance-transitive graphs into C-UH graphs that yielded the above-mentioned paper and also allowed to confront, as digraphs, the Pappus graph to the Desargues graph.

These applications as well as the reference  use the following definition.
Given a family C of digraphs, a digraph G is said to be
C-ultrahomogeneous if every isomorphism between two induced members
of C in G extends to an automorphism of G. In, it
is shown that exactly 7 distance-transitive cubic graphs among the
existing 12 possess a particular ultrahomogeneous property with
respect to oriented cycles realizing the girth that allows the
construction of a related Cayley digraph with similar
ultrahomogeneous properties in which those oriented cycles appear
minimally "pulled apart", or "separated" and whose description is
truly beautiful and insightful.

Hamiltonicity in graphs
In 1983, Dejter  found that an equivalent condition for the existence of a Z4-Hamilton cycle on the graph of chessknight moves of the usual type (1,2),(resp
(1,4)) on the 2nx2n-board is that n is odd larger than 2, (resp. 4). These results are cited by I. Parberry, in relation to the algorithmic aspects of the knight's tour problem.

In 1985, Dejter presented a construction technique for Hamilton cycles in the middle-levels graphs. The existence of such cycles had been conjectured by I. Havel in 1983. and by M. Buck and D. Wiedemann in 1984, (though Béla Bollobás presented it to Dejter as a Paul Erdős' conjecture in Jan. 1983) and established by T. Mütze in 2014. That technique was used by Dejter et al.

In 2014, Dejter returned to this problem and established a canonical ordering of the vertices in a quotient graph (of each middle-levels graph under the action of a dihedral group) in one-to-one correspondence with an initial section of a system of numeration (present as sequence A239903 in the On-Line Encyclopedia of Integer Sequences by Neil Sloane)
 composed by restricted growth strings (with the k-th Catalan number expressed by means of the string 10...0 with k "zeros" and a single "one", as J. Arndt does in page 325 ) and related to Kierstead-Trotter lexical matching colors. This system of numeration may apply to a dihedral-symmetric restricted version of the middle-levels conjecture.

In 1988, Dejter showed that for any positive integer n, all 2-covering graphs of the complete graph Kn on n vertices
can be determined; in addition, he showed that among them there is only one graph that is connected and has a maximal automorphism group, which happens to be bipartite; Dejter also showed that an i-covering graph of Kn is hamiltonian, for i less than 4, and that properly minimal connected non-hamiltonian covering graphs of Kn are obtained which are 4-coverings
of Kn; also, non-hamiltonian connected 6-coverings of Kn
were constructed in that work.

Also in 1988, Dejter showed that if k, n and q are integers such that if 0 <2k<n=2kq1, then the graph generated by the generalized chessknight moves of type (1,2k) on the 2n x 2n-chessboard has Hamilton cycles invariant under quarter turns. For k=1,  respectively 2, this extends to the following necessary and sufficient condition for the existence of such cycles: that  n is odd and larger than 2k-1.

In 1990, Dejter showed that if n and r are integers larger than 0 with n+r larger than 2, then the difference of two concentric square boards A and B with (n + 2r)2 and n2 entries respectively has a chessknight Hamilton cycle invariant under quarter-turns if and only if r is larger than 2 and either n or r is odd.

In 1991, Dejter and Neumann-Lara showed that given a group Zn acting freely on a graph G, the notion of a voltage graph is applied to the search for Hamilton cycles in G invariant under an action of Zn on G. As an application, for n = 2 and 4, equivalent conditions and lower bounds for chessknight Hamilton cycles containing paths spanning square quadrants and rectangular half-boards were found, respectively.

Coloring the arcs of biregular graphs 
Recalling that each edge of a graph H has two oppositely oriented arcs, each vertex v of H is identified with the set of arcs (v,e) departing from v along the edges e of H incident to v. Let H be a (λ,μ)-biregular graph with bipartition (Y,X), where |Y|=kμ and |X|=kλ, where k<0, λ and μ are integers. In, Dejter considered the problem of assigning, for each edge e=yx of H, a color given by an element of Y, respectively X, to the arc (y,e), respectively (x,e), so that each color is assigned exactly once in the set of arcs departing from each vertex of H. Furthermore, Dejter set such assignment to fulfill a specific bicolor weight function over a monotonic subset of Y×X, pointing that this problem applies to the Design of Experiments for Industrial Chemistry, Molecular Biology, Cellular Neuroscience, etc. An algorithmic construction based on biregular graphs with bipartitions given by cyclic-group pairs is also presented in Dejter's work, as well as three essentially different solutions to the Great Circle Challenge Puzzle based on a different biregular graph whose bipartition is formed by the vertices and 5-cycles of the Petersen graph.

Perfect dominating sets
A perfect dominating set S of a graph G is a set of vertices of G such that every vertex of G is either in S or is adjacent to exactly one vertex of S. Weichsel showed that a perfect dominating set of the n-cube Qn induces a subgraph of Qn whose components are isomorphic to hypercubes and conjectured that each of these hypercubes has the same dimension. In 1993, Dejter and Weichsel presented the first known cases in which those components have the same dimension but different directions, namely in the 8-cube with components that are 1-cubes formed each by one edge, with the involved edges happening in:

(a) four different directions, as told by Alexander Felzenbaum to Weichsel in Rehovot, Israel, 1988;

(b) eight different directions, which involves the Hamming code of length 7, the Heawood graph, the Fano plane and the Steiner triple system of order 7.

The result of (a) above is immediately extended to perfect dominating sets in cubes of dimensions which are powers of 2 whose components contain each an only edge in half the coordinate direction. On the other hand, in 1991, Dejter and Phelps extended the result of (b) above again to cubes whose dimensions are powers of 2, with components composed each by a unique edge in all coordinate directions. (However, this result is not yet extended to q-ary cubes, as planned by the authors).

The Weichsel conjecture was answered in the affirmative by Östergård and Weakley, who found a perfect dominating set in the 13-cube whose components are 26 4-cubes and 288 isolated vertices. Dejter and Phelps gave a short and elegant proof of this result.

Efficient dominating sets
An E-chain is a countable family of nested graphs, each of which has
an efficient dominating set. The Hamming codes in the n-cubes
provide a classical example of E-chains. Dejter and Serra<ref
name="DS">Dejter I. J.; Serra O. "Efficient dominating sets in Cayley graphs", Discrete Appl. Math., 129 (2003), no. 2-3, 319-328.</ref> gave a constructing tool to produce E-chains of Cayley graphs. This tool was used to construct infinite families of E-chains of Cayley graphs generated by transposition trees of diameter 2 on symmetric groups. These graphs, known as star graphs, had the efficient domination property established by Arumugam and Kala.
In contrast, Dejter and O. Tomaiconza showed that there is no efficient dominating set in any Cayley graph generated by a transposition tree of diameter 3. Further study on threaded distance trees and E-sets of star graphs was conducted by Dejter. In 2012, Dejter adapted the results cited above to the case of digraphs. In fact, worst-case efficient dominating sets in digraphs are conceived
so that their presence in certain strong digraphs corresponds to
that of efficient dominating sets in star graphs. The fact that the
star graphs form a so-called dense segmental neighborly E-chain<ref
name="DS" /> is reflected in a corresponding fact for digraphs.

Quasiperfect dominating sets

In 2009, Dejter defined a vertex subset S of a graph G as a
quasiperfect dominating set in G if each vertex v of G not in S
is adjacent to dv ∈{1,2} vertices of S, and then
investigated perfect and quasiperfect dominating sets in the regular
tessellation graph of Schläfli symbol {3,6} and in its toroidal
quotient graphs, yielding the classification of their perfect dominating
sets and most of their quasiperfect dominating sets S with induced
components of the form Kν, where
ν ∈{1,2,3} depends only on S.

Coding theory

Invariants of perfect error-correcting codes
Invariants of perfect error-correcting codes were addressed by
Dejter in, and Dejter and Delgado in which it
is shown that a perfect 1-error-correcting code C is 'foldable' over
its kernel via the Steiner triple systems associated to its
codewords. The resulting 'folding' produces a graph invariant for C
via Pasch configurations and tensors. Moreover, the invariant is
complete for Vasil'ev codes of length 15 as viewed by F. Hergert, showing the
existence of nonadditive propelinear 1-perfect codes, and allowing to visualize a propelinear code by means
of the commutative group formed by its classes mod kernel, as well
as to generalize the notion of a propelinear code by extending the
involved composition of permutations to a more general group
product.

Generalizing perfect Lee codes
Motivated by an application problem in computer architecture,
Araujo, Dejter and Horak introduced
a notion of perfect distance-dominating set, PDDS, in a graph,
constituting a generalization of perfect Lee codes,
diameter perfect codes, and other codes and dominating
sets, and thus initiating a systematic study of such vertex sets.
Some of these sets, related to the motivating application, were constructed, and the
non-existence of others was demonstrated. In fact, an extension of the
long-standing Golomb-Welch Conjecture, in terms of
PDDSs, was stated.

Total perfect codes
According to Dejter and Delgado, given a vertex subset S'
of a side Pm of an m x n grid graph G, the perfect dominating sets
S in G with S' being the intersection of S with V(Pm) can be
determined via an exhaustive algorithm of running time O(2m+n).
Extending the algorithm to infinite-grid graphs of width m-1,
periodicity makes the binary decision tree prunable into a finite
threaded tree, a closed walk of which yields all such sets S. The
graphs induced by the complements of such sets S can be codified by
arrays of ordered pairs of positive integers, for the growth and
determination of which a speedier algorithm exists. A recent
characterization of grid graphs having total perfect codes S (i.e. with just 1-cubes as induced components, also called 
1-PDDS and DPL(2,4)), due to Klostermeyer and
Goldwasser, allowed Dejter and Delgado to show that
these sets S are restrictions of only one total perfect code S1 in
the planar integer lattice graph, with the extra-bonus that the
complement of S1 yields an aperiodic tiling, like the Penrose
tiling. In contrast, the parallel, horizontal, total perfect codes
in the planar integer lattice graph are in 1-1 correspondence with
the doubly infinite {0,1}-sequences.

Dejter showed that there
is an uncountable number of parallel total perfect codes in the
planar integer lattice graph L; in contrast, there is just
one 1-perfect code, and just one total perfect code in L, the latter code
restricting to total perfect codes of rectangular grid graphs
(which yields an asymmetric, Penrose, tiling of the plane); in
particular, Dejter characterized all cycle products Cm x Cn
containing parallel total perfect codes, and the d-perfect and total
perfect code partitions of L and Cm x Cn, the former having as
quotient graph the undirected Cayley graphs of the cyclic group of
order 2d2+2d+1 with generator set {1,2d2}.

In 2012, Araujo and Dejter made a conjecturing
contribution to the classification of lattice-like total perfect
codes in n-dimensional integer lattices via pairs (G,F) formed by
abelian groups G and homomorphisms F from Zn onto G, in the line of the Araujo-Dejter-Horak work cited above.

Combinatorial designs

Since 1994, Dejter intervened in several projects in 
Combinatorial Designs initially suggested by Alexander Rosa, C. C. Lindner
and C. A. Rodger and also worked upon with E. Mendelsohn, F. Franek,
D. Pike, P. A. Adams, E. J. Billington, D. G. Hoffman, M. Meszka and others, 
which produced results in the following subjects:

Invariants for
2-factorization and cycle systems,

Triangles
in 2-factorizations,

Number of 4-cycles in
2-factorizations of complete graphs,

Directed almost resolvable Hamilton-Waterloo problem,

Number of 4-cycles in 2-factorizations of K2n
minus a 1-factor,

Almost resolvable
4-cycle systems,

Critical sets for the completion of Latin squares

Almost resolvable
maximum packings of complete graphs with 4-cycles.

References

1939 births
Living people
People from Bahía Blanca
Argentine emigrants to the United States
Argentine Jews
Argentine people of Moldovan-Jewish descent
Argentine mathematicians
20th-century American mathematicians
American people of Argentine-Jewish descent
American people of Moldovan-Jewish descent
Coding theorists
Graph theorists
Topologists
Rutgers University alumni
University of Puerto Rico faculty
21st-century American mathematicians